Hindenburg may refer to:

Film and television
 The Hindenburg (film), the 1975 film
 Hindenburg: The Untold Story, a 2007 television docudrama

Places
 Hindenburg, a village in Templin, Brandenburg, Germany
 Hindenburg, Saxony-Anhalt, a village in Stendal, Saxony-Anhalt, Germany
 Hindenburg Range, a mountain range in Papua New Guinea
 Hindenburg O.S., former name of Zabrze, Poland

Vessels
 LZ 129 Hindenburg, an airship involved in a disaster
 Hindenburg-class airships
 Hindenburg (icebreaker)
 SMS Hindenburg, a 1917 battlecruiser built for the Imperial German Navy
  SS Columbus or SS Hindenburg, a German liner

People with the name
 Carl Hindenburg (1741–1808), mathematician
 Gertrud von Hindenburg (1860–1921), German noblewoman and wife of Paul von Hindenburg
 Paul von Hindenburg (1847–1934), German general in World War I and president of Germany (1925–1934)
 Oskar von Hindenburg (1883–1960), German officer, Paul von Hindenburg's son

See also
 Hindenburg Bridge, a former railway bridge over the Rhine river destroyed in World War II
 Hindenburg Cup, a German aviation prize established in 1928
 Hindenburg disaster
 Hindenburg disaster newsreel footage
 Hindenburg Kaserne, a former military base near Würzburg, Franconia, Germany
 Hindenburg light, form of lighting used in the trenches during World War I
 Hindenburg Line, a German defensive line on the Western front during World War I
 Hindenburg-Oberrealschule, a former school in Königsberg, Germany
 Hindenburg Omen, a proposed term in technical analysis of stock prices
 Hindenburg Programme, a German armament program during World War I
 Hindenburgdamm, a rail causeway linking northern Germany to the island of Sylt
 Hindenburg Research, a financial activist firm that specializes in releasing short-seller reports